Deborah Fisher (October 30, 1723 – November 10, 1817), later Deborah Ames and Deborah Woodward, was a tavern owner in Dedham, Massachusetts.

Personal life
Born on October 30, 1723, Fisher was the youngest child of Jeremiah and Deborah Fisher.

Fisher was the second wife Nathaniel Ames, marrying him on October 30, 1742. Deborah and Nathaniel Ames had five children, Nathaniel, Seth, Deborah, William, and Fisher Ames.

When she and her second husband, Richard Woodward, sued a relative over the will and estate of her father, they hired John Adams as their lawyer. Deborah died on November 10, 1817, at which time her tavern was torn down.

Ames' Tavern

Nathaniel's first wife was Fisher's cousin, Mary. Through this marriage, Nathaniel came into possession of Fisher's Tavern, which was founded by one of Fisher's distant relatives, Joshua Fisher. After Nathaniel died, Fisher inherited it.

After her husband Nathaniel died in 1764, Fisher successfully ran the tavern for several years with the help of several of her sons. According to a later family biography, "inn keeping was a favorite occupation with her and she carried natters with a high hand." Befitting her position as an inn keeper, she was astutely interested in politics. Fisher "hated the Jacobins devoutly." As an inn keeper, she was compared to Meg Dods, the innkeeper in the 19th century novel Saint Ronan's Well. She has been described as "a very shrewd and sensible woman of a strong and singular cast of mind."

In 1772, she married Richard Woodward and her home became known as the Woodward Tavern. It was an unhappy marriage, however, and the couple divorced by 1784. Before they did, however, the convention that adopted the Suffolk Resolves met in the tavern and began their work.

Notes

References

Works cited

Businesspeople from Dedham, Massachusetts
1723 births
1817 deaths
People from colonial Dedham, Massachusetts